Julia Bell (28 January 1879 – 26 April 1979) was a pioneering English human geneticist.

Biography
She attended Girton College in Cambridge and took the Mathematical Tripos exam in 1901. But because women could not officially receive degrees from Oxford or Cambridge, she was awarded a master's degree at Trinity College, Dublin for her work investigating solar parallax at Cambridge Observatory. In 1908, she moved to University College London and obtained a position there as an assistant in statistics.

Her mentor was Karl Pearson (1857–1936), one of the founders of modern statistics, who in 1914 asked her to augment the expertise of the Galton Laboratory staff by taking a degree in medicine. She studied at the London School of Medicine for Women (Royal Free Hospital). She qualified in 1922 and was elected a Fellow of the Royal College of Physicians in 1938.

Working as a member of the permanent staff of the Medical Research Council at the Galton Laboratory, University College, Julia Bell did pioneering work in documenting the familial nature of many diseases. She wrote most of the sections in a unique series known as The Treasury of Human Inheritance published between 1909 and 1956, from The Galton Lab. Bell's "combination of mathematical training, genetic knowledge and clinical expertise yielded numerous important insights into human inheritance first appearing in the Treasury," Harper noted. Julia Bell's Treasury of Human Inheritance "remains a valuable scientific as well as an historical record of the genetics of a range of important inherited disorders."

In 1937 Julia Bell published a landmark article with J. B. S. Haldane which reported a linkage between the genes for colourblindness and haemophilia on the X chromosome. This discovery was a key step toward the mapping of the human genome.

Julia Bell kept working actively for many years. At age 82 she wrote an original article on rubella and pregnancy; she retired at age 86; she kept in touch with genetics until her death at the age of 100.

Besides the Martin–Bell syndrome, now known as the fragile X syndrome, Julia Bell's name is associated with five forms of brachydactyly.

References

1879 births
1979 deaths
English geneticists
English centenarians
Alumni of the London School of Medicine for Women
Academics of University College London
People from Sherwood, Nottingham
Human geneticists
English women academics
Women centenarians
Steamboat ladies